The first season of Braxton Family Values, an American reality television series, was broadcast on WE tv. The series aired from April 12, 2011 until June 14, 2011, consisting of 11 episodes.

Production 
In January 2011, WE tv confirmed that it had signed Toni Braxton for a reality series, entitled Braxton Family Values, which is marketed as one of the network's flagship shows.  In its first four airings, Braxton Family Values averaged a 0.63 household rating, attracting 350,000 women in the 18–49 demographic, three times WE tv's average in the Tuesday 9 PM slot. Braxton Family Values was renewed for a second season on May 10, 2011.

Originally the show was supposed to be on Bravo Television Channel and was slated to air in the fall of 2010. On February 12, 2010, Toni Braxton announced its premiere during an interview with Rap- Up Tv.

Synopsis
Braxton Family Values; Five sisters. Only one spotlight. Like their famous sister Toni Braxton, Traci, Towanda, Trina and Tamar were all blessed with singing talent and shared that gift as a group, The Braxtons, managed by their mom, Evelyn. Fast forward a few years and Toni is a megastar with hit after hit and millions of albums sold. Meanwhile, Traci documents her life in Maryland; Towanda pursues acting; Trina becomes a backup for Toni and a part-time wedding singer; and Tamar is working on getting her star to rise with her husband, Vince, a successful music industry executive. See if their super-close sisterly bond and unconditional love can get them through the ups and downs of life in the fab lane.

U.S. television ratings
The season's premiere episode "The Bermuda Triangle" attracted over 1.25 million viewers during its initial broadcast on April 12, 2011, including 0.700 thousand viewers in the 18–49 demographic via Nielsen ratings.

Episodes

References

External links 

 
 
 

2011 American television seasons